KVAY (105.7 FM, "Your Valley Country 105.7") is a radio station broadcasting a country music format. Licensed to Lamar, Colorado, United States, the station is currently owned by Beacon Broadcasting LLC.

History
The station was assigned the call sign KNIC on September 18, 1986. On August 9, 1991, the station changed its call sign to the current KVAY.

References

External links
 
 

VAY
Country radio stations in the United States